Magnesium transporter protein 1 is a protein that in humans is encoded by the MAGT1 gene.

See also 

 Magnesium transporter 1 family

References

Further reading